is a Japanese curler and curling coach from Sapporo, Japan.

Personal life
Abe is employed as a curling team manager at Consadole Hokkaido Sports Club. He is married.

Teams and events

Men's

Mixed doubles

Record as a coach of national teams

References

External links

 Team official website 
 Shinya Abe profile -- Curling World Cup

1980 births
Living people
Japanese male curlers
Pacific-Asian curling champions
Japanese curling champions
Japanese curling coaches
People from Kitami, Hokkaido
Sportspeople from Hokkaido
Sportspeople from Sapporo
21st-century Japanese people